British Insulated Callender's Cables (BICC) was a 20th-century British cable manufacturer and construction company, now renamed after its former subsidiary Balfour Beatty. It was formed from the merger of two long established cable firms, Callender's Cable & Construction Company and British Insulated Cables.

History

Callender's Cable & Construction Company
Callender's Cable & Construction Company was founded by William Ormiston Callender in 1870. It was originally an importer and refiner of bitumen for road construction but began manufacturing insulated cables at their Erith site on the Thames in the 1880s.

It played a significant role in construction of the British National Grid in the 1930s building the 132 kV crossing of the Thames at Dagenham with overhead cables spanning 3060 feet (932m) between two 487 ft (148m) towers, and allowing 250 ft (76m) clearance for shipping. Callender's research and engineering laboratories were based at a former power station site in White City, London, close to Ormiston House, where the company's founder had lived.

British Insulated Cables
British Insulated Cables was founded as the British Insulated Wire Company at Prescot, near Liverpool in 1890. It bought the rights to a paper-insulated power cable capable of transmitting electricity at 10,000 volts, for use at Deptford Power Station, from Sebastian Ziani de Ferranti. It went on to acquire the Telegraph Manufacturing Company in 1902 and was renamed British Insulated Cables in 1925.

Post-merger
Callender's Cable & Construction Company and British Insulated Cables merged to form British Insulated Callender's Cables in 1945. The company was renamed BICC in 1975.

BICC had a world presence which was initially in the Commonwealth but in the 1980s and 1990s extended into mainland Europe and beyond. Acquisition of Spanish and Portuguese companies gave entry in turn to South America and other parts of Africa. Disastrous investments in former East Germany and Russia helped bring the business to its knees at the same time as margins in every other part of the cable-making businesses came under attack.
	
In the 1970s the firm had UK works at Erith, Prescot, Kirkby, Leyton, Helsby, Leigh, Melling, Wrexham, Blackley, Belfast and Huyton (now Hi-Wire Ltd) making electric power cables, telecommunications cables and metals. BICC's (originally Callender's) research and engineering laboratories at a former power station site in White City, London was close to Ormiston House, William Ormiston Callender's house of the 1870s.  In 1988 the research and engineering facilities moved to new premises at the company's Wrexham and Helsby sites.

In January 1991 British Copper Refiners, a subsidiary of BICC, announced the closure of the Prescot plant with the loss of 230 jobs.

In 1999 the ailing BICC sold its optical cables business to Corning and power cables businesses to General Cable.

BICC also owned construction company Balfour Beatty and, following sale of its cable operations, BICC renamed itself Balfour Beatty in 2000.

In 2002, Pirelli, who acquired the Erith plant from General Cable announced the closure of part of the site and the transfer of the production of oil-filled cable to their Eastleigh works in Hampshire.

In 2020 the BICC Cables name continued in use at the former BICC Egypt power cable plant in Giza.

Callender's Cableworks Band

This was an amateur brass band, active between 1898 and 1961, of which all members were employees of Callender's at Erith. They rehearsed and performed in their leisure time, while the company in its role of patron lent its name and supplied uniforms and instruments. The band broadcast prolifically on BBC Radio in the 1920s and 1930s.

References

Further reading
 R.M. Morgan, 1982, Callenders 1882-1945, BICC plc.

External links
 National Museums Liverpool Archives Department  Information sheet 63 - British Insulated Callenders Cables PLC
 

Cable manufacture in London
British companies established in 1945
Companies based in Kent
Wire and cable manufacturers
Companies formerly listed on the London Stock Exchange
Manufacturing companies disestablished in 2000
Industry on the River Thames
1945 establishments in England
2000 disestablishments in England
Structural steel
Manufacturing companies established in 1945
British companies disestablished in 2000